The 2022–23 season is Portsmouth's 124th year in existence and sixth consecutive season in League One. Along with the league, the club will also compete in the FA Cup, the EFL Cup and the EFL Trophy. The season commenced on 30 July 2022.

Portsmouth F.C. will become 125 years old on 5 April 2023.

Players

Squad Details
As of 13 August 2022

Statistics

      

     

       

      
      
   

|}

Source:

Goals record

Assist record

Disciplinary record

Transfers

Transfers in

Transfers out

Loans in

Loans out

Pre-season and friendlies
On 17 May, Pompey announced their first batch of pre-season friendlies with trips to Havant & Waterlooville, Gosport Borough and Gillingham, with an XI side also travelling to Bognor Regis Town. A week later, a trip to face Leyton Orient was also added to the schedule. A home pre-season friendly was confirmed on June 8, against Coventry City. A further away pre-season friendly was confirmed on 17 June, against Bristol City. A Pompey XI side would also face Barnet prior to the new season. A training camp match in Spain against Qatar SC was also added.

Mid-season

Competitions

League One

League table

Results summary

Results by round

Matches

On 23 June, the league fixtures were announced.

FA Cup

Portsmouth were drawn away to Hereford in the first round, at home to Milton Keynes Dons in the second round and away to Tottenham Hotspur in the third round.

EFL Cup

Pompey were drawn away to Cardiff City in the first round and to Newport County in the second round.

EFL Trophy

On 20 June, the initial Group stage draw was made, grouping Portsmouth with AFC Wimbledon and Crawley Town. Three days later, Aston Villa U21s joined Southern Group B. Pompey were then drawn away to Ipswich Town in the second round, and at home to Stevenage in the third round and away to Bolton Wanderers in the quarter-final.

References

Portsmouth
Portsmouth F.C. seasons